Live from the Rock Folk and Blues Festival is an annual roots music festival started in 2003 in Red Rock, Ontario. The festival is run by volunteers only on the most part.

External links
 Official website

Music festivals in Ontario
Folk festivals in Canada
Culture of Northern Ontario
Music festivals established in 2003